The 2015 women's road cycling season was the fourth for the  cycling team, which began as Be Pink in 2012.

Team roster

2015

As of 29 March 2016. Ages as of 1 January 2016. 

Riders who joined the team for the 2015 season

Riders who left the team during or after the 2014 season

Season victories

UCI world ranking

The 2015 UCI Women's Road Rankings are rankings based upon the results in all UCI-sanctioned races of the 2015 women's road cycling season.

BePink LaClassica finished 16th in the 2015 ranking for UCI teams.

References

External links
 

2015 UCI Women's Teams seasons
2015 in Italian sport